Myktybek Yusupovich Abdyldayev (born 17 August 1953) is a Kyrgyz politician, and current member of the Supreme Council of Kyrgyzstan as deputy for the Bir Bol party.

Early life and education
Abdyldayev was born on 17 August 1953 in the village of Kara-Jygach in Chuy Oblast in the Kirgiz SSR, now Kyrgyzstan. In 1976 he completed his degree in philology at the Kyrgyz State National University.

Career

Komsomol and civil service career, 1976 to 1990
Abdyldayev left his first job as a turner in a factory in Frunze in 1976, after five years of work and completion of studies to become secretary for the Komsomol committee in Frunze's Technical College of Soviet Trade, and then became its secretary for its committee in the Issyk-Kul Oblast between 1982 and 1983.

He rose up the ranks of the political bureaucracy, leaving his Komsomol role to become head of the political department of the Department of Internal Affairs of Issyk-Kul Oblast's executive committee between 1983 and 1986.

His final role in the Soviet Union was as a deputy in the Supreme Soviet of the Kirghiz SSR, holding the position after being elected in the 1990 Kirghiz Supreme Soviet election. Although one source indicates that he did not hold this position for long, serving only until 1991 (when the Supreme Soviet became the Jogorku Kenesh), another source indicates that he was deputy until the 1995 parliamentary election.

Post-Soviet career, 1991 to present

Internal affairs roles, 1991 to 2001
Kyrgyzstan declared itself sovereign in December 1990, and independent in August 1991, with Askar Akayev as president. After independence, Abdyldayev spent the 1990s in roles in internal affairs departments – he returned to Issyk-Kul's internal affairs department as head between November 1991 to November 1994, before being recruited to serve as the Deputy Minister for the nationwide Ministry of Internal Affairs in the same month. He held the position for two and a half years before being promoted to First Deputy Minister in March 1997. He left in January 2001.

Akayev to Bakiyev, 2001 to 2010
After leaving the post of first deputy minister for internal affairs, Abdyldayev was appointed Deputy Secretary of the Security Council of the Kyrgyz Republic and also as Director of the International Institute for Strategic Studies under the President of the Kyrgyz Republic, in February 2001. He then was made head of the Department for Defense and Security Affairs of the Presidential Administration of the Kyrgyz Republic in 2002 during Askar Akayev's presidency, and also gained the post of Prosecutor General in the same year. Akayev dismissed Abdyldayev in March 2005, for 'poor work' in dealing with the protests related to the Tulip Revolution.

After a long period of working at the regional and nationwide internal affairs departments, Abdyldayev returned once again to an internal affairs role as Acting Deputy Minister for Internal Affairs in March 2005, in the wake of the Tulip Revolution.

Abdyldayev did not return to a government role for another year, until being appointed by Akayev's successor, Kurmanbek Bakiyev, to the head of the Presidential Administration, serving for from May 2006 to April 2007, when he resigned in wake of protests calling for a fresh presidential election.

Jogorku Kenesh deputy, 2010 to present
After the wake of 2010 Kyrgyz revolution, he was elected as deputy for the Ata-Zhurt party in the 2010 parliamentary elections, and was leader from November 2012 to April 2014. In 2015, he switched his affiliation to the Bir Bol party.

In April 2011, Abdyldayev was part of a procession of deputies who sacrificed rams outside the Jogorku Kenesh building, just before the morning session of the day started. It was done to stop 'evil spirits' disrupting the work of the legislature.

Abdyldayev is married with two children.

See also
List of members of the Supreme Council (Kyrgyzstan), 2015–present

References

Living people
1953 births
People from Chüy Region
Members of the Supreme Council (Kyrgyzstan)
Kyrgyz National University alumni